Home Quarters Warehouse (HQ) was an American chain of "big-box" home improvement stores, originally based in Virginia Beach, Virginia. In 1984, the chemical manufacturing company W.R. Grace & Co. announced its intentions to enter the home improvement retail business, hiring Bernard R. Kossar and Frank Doczi to head the new chain.

History
The first Home Quarters stores opened in February 1985 in Virginia Beach and Hampton, Virginia. Grace spun off HQ in 1986, and in October 1987 HQ was in the midst of doing an IPO when "Black Monday" occurred. The SEC put a moratorium on any IPO until the stock market stabilized. In December 1987, Hechinger agreed to buy HQ for $66 million. The merger was completed in February 1988, with Frank Doczi left in charge of the Home Quarters division (Kossar moves on to found OW Office Warehouse, an office supply store that used a logo and branding similar to that of HQ). Under Hechinger, HQ expanded to much of the United States as a viable competitor to Home Depot, Lowe's, and Builders Square.

However, by 1995 its parent company Hechinger had been hit with financial trouble and began to scale back its operations, including moving HQ's headquarters from Virginia Beach to Hechinger's main office in Landover, Maryland. The Hechinger family sold the company to Los Angeles investors Leonard Green & Partners for $507 million in July 1997, and the management launched new, smaller concept stores called Better Spaces and Wye River Hardware & Home searching for a niche. In September, Hechinger/HQ was merged with San Antonio, Texas-based Builders Square, formerly owned by Kmart.

After several rounds of store closings, Hechinger Co. and Home Quarters Warehouse filed for Chapter 11 bankruptcy protection on June 11, 1999, but the reorganization failed. That September, Hechinger's assets were liquidated, including its 117 remaining stores.

References
 Golubovskis, George. "Hechinger no longer our hometown store," Washington Business Journal, July 18, 1997
 "Post 200: Hechinger Co.," The Washington Post, April 28, 1997.
  "100 JOBS LOST IN HECHINGER OVERHAUL," The Virginian-Pilot August 24, 1995.

External links
Bathroom Remodel Ideas
Bathroom Remodel & Renovation

Home improvement retailers of the United States
Defunct retail companies of the United States
Defunct companies based in Virginia
Companies based in Virginia Beach, Virginia
American companies established in 1984
Companies that filed for Chapter 11 bankruptcy in 1999
Retail companies established in 1984
Retail companies disestablished in 1999
1984 establishments in Virginia
1999 disestablishments in Virginia